Nathampannai is a panchayat town in Pudukkottai district in the Indian state of Tamil Nadu.

Demographics
 India census, Nathampannai had a population of 6398. Males constitute 50% of the population and females 50%. Nathampannai has an average literacy rate of 72%, higher than the national average of 59.5%: male literacy is 79%, and female literacy is 65%. In Nathampannai, 12% of the population is under 6 years.

References

Cities and towns in Pudukkottai district